Comitas powelli is a species of sea snail, a marine gastropod mollusc in the family Pseudomelatomidae.

Description
The length of the shell attains 15 mm.

Distribution
This marine species occurs on Mid-Pacific Seamounts between Marshall Islands and Hawaii

References

 Rehder H. A. & Ladd H. S. (1973) Deep and shallow-water mollusks from the Central Pacific. Science Reports of the Tohoku University, Sendai, ser. 2 (Geology) Special vol. 6 (Hatai Memorial Volume): 37-49, pl. 3. page(s): 45

External links
 
 

powelli
Gastropods described in 1973